The ninth season of Beverly Hills, 90210, is an American drama television series aired from September 16, 1998, on Fox and concluded on May 19, 1999, after 26 episodes. 

The season aired Wednesday nights at 8/9c and was released on DVD in 2010.

Synopsis
The West Beverly gang as they evolve into adulthood, experiencing new problems as they learn more about themselves and their personal ambitions. Old friendships will be strained as new relationships form as their worlds change, but no matter how convoluted their worlds become, they will always share their strengths and experiences. They will still deal with numerous issues that adults face in their personnel and professional lives issues such as dysfunctional families, alcohol abuse, infidelity, financial problems, statutory rape, gang violence, relationships, crime, careers, drug abuse, bulimia, and rape.

Cast

Starring
Jason Priestley as Brandon Walsh (episodes 1–5)
Jennie Garth as Kelly Taylor 
Ian Ziering as Steve Sanders  
Brian Austin Green as David Silver 
Tori Spelling as Donna Martin  
Tiffani-Amber Thiessen as Valerie Malone (episodes 1–7)
Vincent Young as Noah Hunter  
Lindsay Price as Janet Sosna 
Joe E. Tata as Nat Bussichio 
Daniel Cosgrove as Matt Durning (episodes 4–26)
Vanessa Marcil as Gina Kincaid (episodes 7–26)

Special guest star
Luke Perry as Dylan McKay (episodes 7–26)

Recurring
Denise Dowse as Vice Principal Yvonne Teasley

Episodes
 Jason Priestley's and Tiffani Amber Thiessen's last season
 Luke Perry returns as a recurring character before returning as a main member
 This season marks the first season having a low episode count as seasons previous had episodes over 30. 

Source:

References

1998 American television seasons
1999 American television seasons
Beverly Hills, 90210 seasons